This article is a comparison of the Turkic states.

Geography

 EEZ of Turkey includes Marmara, which is an internal sea and Black Sea, which is established with treaties. Agean and Mediterranean EEZs are calculated with median lines. Turkey's Mavi Vatan claims have 462,000 km² EEZ.
 EEZ of Caspian Sea includes treaty between Russia, Azerbaijan and Kazakhstan, other parts are calculated with median lines.

Politics

Government

International organisation membership

 Azerbaijan participates in International Transport Forum and Joint OECD/ITF Transport Research Committee and Global Forum on Transparency and Exchange of Information for Tax Purposes.
 Kazakhstan signed Memorandum of understanding on 21 December 2018. Participates as a member of the Development Centre and Global Forum on Transparency and Exchange of Information for Tax Purposes.
 Northern Cyprus has two representatives as "Turkish Cypriot Community" in PACE.

Freedom indices

Economy

Demographics

Telecommunication

See also

Comparison of the Baltic states
Comparison of the Benelux countries
Comparison of the Nordic countries

References

Turkic peoples